Sepedonella is a genus of flies in the family Sciomyzidae, the marsh flies or snail-killing flies..

Species
S. bredoi Verbeke, 1950
S. castanea Knutson, Deeming & Ebejer, 2018
S. nana Verbeke, 1950
S. straeleni Verbeke, 1956
S. wittei Verbeke, 1950

References

Sciomyzidae
Sciomyzoidea genera